Festuca Pass is a mountain pass through the Ilgachuz Range in the West-Central Interior of British Columbia, Canada. Located in a valley west of Carnlick Creek between Calliope Mountain and Pipe Organ Mountain, Festuca Pass is the only named pass in the Ilgachuz Range. It was named by Roy Taylor of UBC Botanical Gardens after Festuca altaica, a grass species that is present in the pass.

References

External links

Mountain passes of British Columbia
Ilgachuz Range